Gladys Pearl ( Monroe) Baker, also known as Gladys Pearl Monroe Mortensen Eley (May 27, 1902 – March 11, 1984), was the mother of American actress Marilyn Monroe, born Norma Jeane Mortenson. Born in Mexico, Baker grew up in the Los Angeles metro area. After suffering from mental illness and alcoholism, her father died in 1908.

Baker was married three times for three to four years each marriage. She was married for the first time at age 14 to Jasper Newton Baker. They had two children, and at the end of the marriage Jasper kidnapped the children and returned with them to his native Kentucky. Baker moved to Kentucky to be near her children but left after four months. She had limited contact thereafter. Her short marriage to Martin Edward Mortensen ended in divorce. She had a relationship with Charles Stanley Gifford, who was separated from his wife, and they were parents to Norma Jeane Mortenson, but Gifford was never part of Norma Jeane's life. Baker struggled to take care of her daughter and placed her with a foster family weeks after her birth.

Prone to mood swings, Baker had a mental breakdown after the death of her son, suicide of her father, and news that her studio was shutting down. From 1934 until the 1960s, Gladys spent most of her time in psychiatric facilities. During that time, Baker had a three-year marriage to John Stewart Eley, who died before she could divorce him. In her later years, she lived with her other daughter Berniece and then in a senior care facility.

Early life
Gladys Pearl Monroe was born on May 27, 1902 in Porfiro Dìaz (now named Piedras Negras, Coahuila)  in Mexico, across the border from Eagle Pass, Texas. Her mother, Della Mae Monroe (née Hogan), was from Arkansas, and her father, Otis Elmer Monroe, was a house painter from Indianapolis. He also sold portraits and landscapes that he had painted and dreamed of living in Paris. At the time of Baker's birth, Otis worked for the National Railroad of Mexico painting railway cars. Della was a midwife and an unofficial teacher. In the spring of 1903, the family moved to Los Angeles County, where Otis worked for the Pacific Electric Railway Company.

Baker and her brother, Marion Otis Elmer (born in 1905), had an unstable upbringing due to their father's alcoholism, frequent moves, and their parent's troubled marriage. Otis was prone to fits of rage and crying, migraines, dementia, and seizures. Her father was institutionalized at Patton State Hospital in San Bernardino County in November 1908. He had an advanced, untreatable case of neurosyphilis and was semiparalyzed due to paresis. He was insane by the time of his death on July 22, 1909. Della supported the children as a domestic worker and by renting out rooms of her house.

She married a second time to Lyle Arthur Graves, a railway switchman supervisor at Pacific Electric, on March 7, 1912. They lived in Los Angeles at Graves' house. Della divorced him on January 17, 1914, charging Graves with "failure to provide, dissipation and habitual intemperance." Della lived in Oregon by September 1914 and she married a man named Chitwood, or Charles E. Young on July 26, 1916, in Portland. Baker got along with this stepfather and had fond memories of living on a farm in Oregon. Della divorced again, this time citing alcoholism.

By 1916, Baker lived in Venice, Los Angeles with her mother and brother. Baker was a social teen at school who, like her mother, preferred older men. Marion went to live in San Diego with cousins in a household that was headed by a father. In 1917, Della began a tumultuous relationship with Charles Grainger, a widower with two sons. Della and Baker lived off and on at his nearby two-room bungalow. The couple was never married, but Della went by Mrs. Grainger. Baker was very unhappy living with Grainger, as she had been with Graves.

Marriage to Jasper Baker
At the age of 14, Baker met John Newton ("Jasper" or "Jap") Baker (1886–1951), a business man from Kentucky who was a "violent drinker" who would beat Baker during their marriage. He owned the apartment building that Della managed. They were married on May 17, 1917, with her mother's permission and a signed affidavit that Baker was 18. Baker gave birth to a son Robert Kermit "Jackie" (1918–1933), followed by a daughter, Berniece Inez Gladys (1919–2014). Jackie fell out of their car, suffered injuries, and was lame for the rest of his life. After abusive incidents, Baker filed for divorce from Jasper in 1921, and was awarded custody of the children, leading Jasper to kidnap the children and move back to his native Kentucky, where his mother helped raise them.

About one year later, when she was twenty years of age, Baker moved to Kentucky to live near her children. She worked cleaning houses and caring for children, one of whom was named Norma Jeane. After four months, though, she returned to California. Jasper married a woman who was good to her children, and Baker was afraid of Jasper who had bloodied her back while she was in Kentucky. Noone would help her get her children back. According to Spoto, Baker visited the children once in Kentucky and then had "infrequent attempts to contact" Jackie and Berniece during their childhood. She had not developed the emotional stability to properly care for the children.

After Baker lost her children, she changed and became a heavy drinker, according to Della. Jackie reportedly died in his twenties, never seeing his mother again. Berniece did not see her mother for many years.

Like her mother, Della, Baker was subject to mood swings and over time had relationships with men who were physical abusers and alcoholics. Both women thought that they were being followed.

Hollywood

The film industry was flourishing by 1923 when 576 films were released and 43 million people, more than 40% of the country's population, went to see black-and-white silent films. In 1923, 130,000 workers supported the film industry, having risen from 35,000 workers in 1919. In 1923, Gladys moved to Hollywood and worked for Consolidated Film Industries as a negative film cutter. She worked six days a week cutting out portions of the film that studio editors marked for removal. Another group of people assembled the strips in order to create the final release negative. Baker also worked as a film cutter at Columbia Pictures and RKO.

She met Grace McKee, a supervisor at Consolidates, and they became good friends. In the summer of 1923, they moved into an apartment in an area that came to be known as Silver Lake in Los Angeles and east of Hollywood. The two women embraced the freedom of the Roaring Twenties, becoming flappers "who chose to extend the recent women's suffrage amendment to include the various social and sexual autonomies long claimed by men." Grace transformed Baker from a brown-haired "plain jane" to an attractive red-headed woman who wore stylish clothing.

During the time that Baker worked at RKO she was described as having little affect and closed off. She was also described by coworkers, though, as beautiful, having twinkling green eyes and a lively spirit, delightful, and funny.

Marriage to Martin Edward Mortensen
In the summer of 1924, Baker met Martin Edward Mortensen (1897–1981), the son of a Norwegian immigrant a 27-year-old meterman for the Southern California Gas Company. They both had been married once before. They married on October 11, 1924. Baker was initially attracted, among other things, to Mortensen's stability, but after they were married she became bored with him. She left him around early 1925 and moved in with Grace. Mortensen filed a divorce petition on May 26, 1925, citing desertion, and he tried to win his wife back. They were divorced on August 15, 1928.

Relationship with Charles Stanley Gifford and Norma Jeane

Baker worked as a negative film cutter under Charles Stanley ("Stan") Gifford (1898–1965), her superior at RKO Pictures, and had a personal relationship with him. Gifford had separated from his wife, Lillian Priester, in October 1923. They were divorced in May 1925. Gifford was a self-proclaimed womanizer. Beside Gifford, Baker dated other men in 1925.
 
In late 1925, 10 months after she left her husband, she found out that she was pregnant. In the winter of 1925, Gifford took Baker to meet his family. They did not approve of his marrying a pregnant woman who was not raising her existing children.

She gave birth to her third and final child, Norma Jeane Baker (later known as Marilyn Monroe) on June 1, 1926, in the Los Angeles County Hospital. She did not allow Gifford to visit her in the hospital. He later remarried and kept his illegitimate daughter a secret from his wife. Because Baker was still married to Mortensen, he was legally Norma Jeane's father. Norma Jeane was told that her father was dead. In 2022, DNA testing confirmed Gifford was the father.

Baker registered the surname Mortenson on Norma Jeane's birth certificate, using the name of her estranged husband and specifying his address as unknown. She also stated that she had previously had two children, but incorrectly stated that they were no longer living. Norma Jeane was baptised with the name Baker, when her grandmother Della tried to hide the illegitimacy.

Norma Jeane's early years

There were a number of reasons why motherhood did not suit Baker. Besides lacking in parenting skills or a lifestyle that would suit motherhood, Baker needed her job and did not have viable day care options. More concerning, she experienced severe post partum depression and was unable to take care of Norma Jeane. On one occasion, Grace prevented Baker from stabbing her daughter. Taraborrelli stated that Gladys accused Grace of trying to poison the baby and then stabbed her with a knife.

Within two weeks of Norma Jeane's birth, Baker placed her baby with a foster family who lived  from her, Evangelical Christians Albert and Ida Bolender in the rural town of Hawthorne. The Bolenders lived across the street from Della, Baker's mother. Initially, Baker moved in with the Olenders and shared a room with Norma Jeane until she was six months old. She then returned to Hollywood to manage an increase in her workload. Baker visited Norma Jeane and took her on trolly cars to the beach, picnics, restaurants, and other outings on the weekends, sometimes spending the night, but the frequency waned over time. Although she regularly paid $25 for Norma Jeane's care, Baker became "for the most part an irregular, shadowy visitor at the edge of Norma Jeane's life." The Bolenders gave Norma Jean a stable childhood and taught her proper conduct, morality, and religion. At some point, Norma Jean visited her mother on the weekends and enjoyed her mother's carefree lifestyle and her friends. Their time was spent on walks, meals with friends, movie-watching, and attending church. Although Baker could be carefree, "the problem for Norma Jeane was that she saw Gladys in too many negative moods and situations not to be troubled by her." She often called Baker "the woman with the red hair."

In early 1927, Baker moved into her mother's house because Della had developed a weak heart, respitory problems, degenerative heart disease, and acute depression. In the spring, she suffered a stroke, which led to "unpredictable shifts of mood and temper," along with hallucinations. Della tried to smother Norma Jean with a pillow in July 1927. On August 4, Della was diagnosed with manic-depressive psychosis. She died on August 23, 1927, of a heart attack. Baker's brother Marion disappeared in October 1929 and was pronounced dead in 1939. A fire broke out at the Consolidated Film Industry and gutted the building. Baker is credited with saving a number of lives when she escorted women from the editing studio to outside of the building. Even though her mother had died and her brother was missing, Baker was relatively stable in 1930.

In the summer of 1933, Baker bought a small house in Hollywood with a loan from the Home Owners' Loan Corporation and moved her daughter in with her. They shared the house with lodgers, actors George and Maude Atkinson and their daughter, Nellie. In the summer, while Baker worked at a film lab, Norma Jeane spent the days at theatres watching films.

In the fall of 1933, Baker's son Jackie died of kidney disease, and her mother blamed her for living. Her studio went on strike weeks later. Baker learned in October 1933 that her grandfather Tilford Hogan killed himself. In late 1933, Baker had become very upset when she learned that Norma Jeane had been sexually abused. Baker also became despondent and inconsolable believing that she would likely suffer from mental illness as had her parents and grandfather. She may have also been depressed over neglect of her children. Norma Jeane and Grace cared for her and tried to comfort her, but Baker continued to cry and was not getting the rest she needed. She received medicine from a neurologist, but she had violent reactions to the psychotropic drugs. In January 1934, Baker had a mental breakdown and was diagnosed with paranoid schizophrenia. After several months in a rest home, she was committed to the Los Angeles General Hospital. She was considered incompetent to take care of herself.

For a time, Norma Jeane lived with the Atkinsons in her mother's house, and Grace looked after Baker's and Norma Jeane's affairs. She took Norma Jeane to the movies and supervised her care on a near daily basis. Occasionally Baker was able to visit with Grace and Norma Jeane on the weekends, but she would be quiet and sad. Norma Jeane later said, "My mother never really made any effort to be with me. I don't think I existed for her."

After she was deemed insane and the state hospital had done all it could to manage Baker's chronic state of depression and agitation, as well as her preoccupation with religion, Grace filed papers in late 1934 for Baker to be committed to Norwalk State Hospital (Metropolitan State Hospital in Norwalk, Los Angeles).

The Atkinsons returned to England in late 1934 and initially Norma Jeane lived with Grace's sister and brother-in-law, Enid and Sam Knebelkamp. She was also cared for by Grace's aunt, Ana Lower. Norma Jeane became a ward of the state, and Grace became Baker's guardian and the sole person responsible to oversee Baker and Norma Jeane's affairs. Grace sold Baker's house in June 1935 and the Atkinsons moved to the Hollywood Hills without Norma Jeane, who subsequently lived in eleven foster homes and the Los Angeles Orphan's Home. In August 1935, Grace married Doc Goddard.

After an escape attempt, Baker was transferred from Norwalk State Hospital to the Agnews State Mental Hospital (now Agnews Developmental Center), near San Francisco, which was a more secure facility. By June 1939, Baker lived at a clinic-supervised boardinghouse in San Francisco. By the mid-1940s, Baker had been released by Agnews and moved to Portland, Oregon. In April 1946, Baker traveled to southern California by bus and Norma Jeane took her into her apartment in Ana Lower's duplex. Baker helped Norma Jeane schedule modeling appointments and with the shopping. After several months, she had trouble adjusting to living with people and moved out of Baker's apartment. Concerned that reporters might find out about Baker's mental illness, Norma Jeane, then going by Marilyn Monroe, said that both of her parents were dead.

Marriage to John Stewart Eley
Baker was married for a third time in 1949, to the electrician John Stewart Eley. Baker claimed that Eley was an abusive alcoholic and filed for divorce in February 1952. The situation was complicated by another woman who claimed to have married Eley before 1949. Eley died on April 23, 1952, and the other woman was awarded his estate.

Final years
Out of the hospital, Baker worked at a nursing home in the Eagle Rock neighborhood of Los Angeles and as a housekeeper in Los Angeles. She was sent money regularly by Norma Jeane, who became an actress under the stage name Marilyn Monroe (adopting Baker's maiden name). Baker was admitted to Rockhaven Sanitarium in 1953, and was supported by Monroe with $250 a month. Grace died in the fall of 1953. Monroe's business manager, Inez Melson, became her guardian until Monroe's death in 1962.

Baker was left a trust fund of $100,000 by her daughter, of which she received $5,000 a year. She made multiple attempts to escape from the sanitarium. In 1963, she was reported to have walked 15 miles to Lakeview Terrace Baptist Church. After being transferred to Camarillo State Mental Hospital, she was released in 1967 and went on to live with her daughter Berniece, until moving into a retirement home in Gainesville, Florida, where she died on March 11, 1984.

In popular culture 
Baker's mental health made headlines in her daughter's career early. In an interview with the Los Angeles Daily News, Monroe stated:

Over the years, Baker's relationship to her children became a subject of debate and was addressed in many films about Monroe, such as: My Week With Marilyn (2011), where she is mentioned but not portrayed onscreen; The Secret Life of Marilyn Monroe (2015), where she is played by Susan Sarandon and Eva Amurri; and Blonde (2022), where she is played by Julianne Nicholson.

Notes

References

Sources

External links 
 

Marilyn Monroe
1902 births
1984 deaths
People from Los Angeles
American expatriates in Mexico
People with schizophrenia